David N. Chartrand,  (January 23, 1960) is a Métis politician and activist who has served as the democratically elected President of the Manitoba Métis Federation since 1997. He is the longest serving President of the Manitoba Métis Federation's history, currently serving an eighth term following the 2022 unprecedented mass acclamation of all elected officials. He has also served as a member of the Board of Governors of the Métis National Council from 1997 to 2021 and held a variety of portfolios, prior to the withdrawal of the Manitoba Métis Federation from the Métis National Council in 2021, over concerns that the Métis National Council was allowing the distortion of the nationally accepted definition of Métis.[2].

Early life 
He was born January 23, 1960, to Martha Chartrand, the fourth of eight children. Raised in Duck Bay, Manitoba, he is the brother of Elbert Chartrand. He was raised in a Salteaux-speaking household, where he learned Red River Métis culture and traditions.

Early career 
When he moved to Winnipeg in 1982, Chartrand started his career working with youth, and later became the manager of The Manor Hotel, from 1982 to 1985. He then worked as a Probation Officer with the Department of Justice for the Province of Manitoba between 1986 and 1990. From 1990 to 1997, he continued his career with the Province of Manitoba, serving as the Executive Director of the Aboriginal Court Worker's Program for the Department of Justice.

Political beginnings 
He was first elected to the Manitoba Métis Federation Board of Directors, from the Winnipeg Region in 1988 and was re-elected four successive times to that position.

He has held numerous volunteer positions including Vice-President of the Indian and Métis Friendship Centre of Winnipeg, President of the Manitoba Association of Friendship Centres, President of the National Association of Friendship Centres and, a founding director and president of Beat the Street, an adult literacy program in Winnipeg.

He has also served on the board of the Northern Justice Society (Simon Fraser University) and served as a Board of Director for the Manitoba Métis Federation for 10 years prior to becoming President in 1997. He also served as a member of the Premier's Economic Advisor Committee for the Province of Manitoba.

He was preceded in Métis politics by his older brother Elbert Chartrand. Elbert was the executive director of the Swan River Indian and Métis Friendship Centre and served as Manitoba Métis Federation Vice-President for the Northwest Métis Council region.

President of the Manitoba Métis Federation 
In 1999, Chartrand began the Métis Human Resource Development Agreement program that has delivered employment and training to thousands of Métis people.

Chartrand initiated an Executive Policy Committee to strengthen the Federation's governance structure, policies and procedures. He was instrumental in establishing the group pension plan for the employees of the Federation, the first ever in the history of the Federation. He also led Constitutional Reform, including the adaptation of the National Métis Definition, which initiated a membership reform within the Federation in 2002.

He has overseen major governmental initiatives, including the establishment of the first-ever Red River Métis specific post-secondary Scholarship and Bursary Endowment Fund in 1999. Through the Louis Riel Institute and the Post-Secondary Education Program, the Manitoba Métis Federation has provided millions in bursaries and funding to Red River Métis university and college students, valued at over $24 million today.

In 2003, Chartrand led and negotiated the devolution of Métis Child and Family Services. Through his leadership, mandated agencies were developed and implemented throughout the province. 

In keeping with his vision to provide the best health care opportunities for the Red River Métis, the first ever Red River Métis-owned and operated pharmacy, MEDOCare was opened for business on December 8, 2012.

In 2014, healthcare support was expanded through a program offering prescription glasses for Red River Métis Elders. In 2016, on Louis Riel Day, the Manitoba Métis Federation Prescription Drug Program was launched, with the Manitoba Métis Federation covering the cost of prescription drugs for all Red River Métis Elders in Manitoba.

After a promise made to the Red River Métis Veterans of Canada in 1997, Chartrand fought diligently for over 20 years for the recognition of Red River Métis Veterans. These efforts came into fruition on June 13, 2019 when the $30-million-dollar Métis Veteran's Agreement was signed and an apology issued to all Métis veterans and their families.

Chartrand recognized that improvements were needed to communicate Red River Métis issues, policies and events with members of Manitoba's Métis Community. He established the “Métis Hour x 2” an award-winning radio broadcast that reached across the Province of Manitoba. The radio show promotes Red River Métis culture, history, current events, community events, weekly report from the Office of the President and overall promotion of the Métis Community. Chartrand also established “Le Métis”, a two-page, full-colour, insert in the Grassroots News Aboriginal newspaper, with a distribution of approximately 40,000 throughout the Province of Manitoba.

In September of 2021, following a 2019 mandate from Citizens at an Annual General Assembly, Chartrand led the Manitoba Métis Federation to withdraw from the Métis National Council over concerns that the Council was allowing the distortion of the accepted definition of Métis by member organizations. 

In 2022 the Metis National Council filed a lawsuit against its former president and the Manitoba Metis Federation alleging financial malfeasance, irregularities and questionable contracts. The lawsuit alleges Chartrand and former leadership made deals to financially benefit themselves. The national council is seeking $15 million in damages. Chartrand denies the allegations.

Legal contributions to the recognition of Métis rights 
As President, Chartrand championed Red River Métis Land Claims, and made significant contributions to the harvesting rights won in Ontario through the R. v. Powley case. One of his first acts upon election was the reinstatement of the Red River Métis Land Claims case. Because of his dedication to the pursuit of Red River Métis rights, the Manitoba Métis Federation won the 2013 Supreme Court decision in Manitoba Métis Federation (MMF) v. Canada. The Supreme Court of Canada recognized that the claim of the Manitoba Métis Community was "not a series of claims for individual relief" but a "collective claim for declaratory relief for the purposes of reconciliation between the descendants of the Métis people of the Red River Valley and Canada" and went on to grant the MMF standing by concluding "[t]his collective claim merits allowing the body representing the collective Métis interest to come before the court".

The decision further held that "[t]he unfinished business of reconciliation of the Métis people with Canadian sovereignty is a matter of national and constitutional import" and issued a declaration "[t]hat the federal Crown failed to implement the land grant provision set out in section 31 of the Manitoba Act, 1870 in accordance with the honour of the Crown".

This opened the door to subsequent Supreme Court decisions like the 2016 Daniels case that recognized the Métis Nation as section rights holders under the Canadian Constitution. On May 27, 2016 a Memorandum of Understanding on Advancing Reconciliation was signed by the Manitoba Métis Federation and the Government of Canada, to foster engagement in an exploratory discussions process to develop a mutually agreeable Framework Agreement.

In 2021, the Manitoba Métis Federation signed a Negotiators Agreement with the Government of Canada to advance reconciliation consistent with the purpose of section 35 of the Constitution Act, 1982.

On July 6, 2021, Chartrand represented the Manitoba Métis Federation in an historic event, signing the Manitoba Métis Self-Government Recognition and Implementation Agreement with Canada, which recognizes and acknowledges the Manitoba Métis Federation as the national government of the Red River Métis. This agreement is the only Métis self-government agreement, paving the way for a modern-day treaty for the Red River Métis.

Personal life 
Chartrand is married to Red River Métis businesswoman Glorian Yakiwchuk, originally from Cranberry Portage, Manitoba. They reside in Winnipeg, Manitoba and are raising their granddaughter, Martha Chartrand.

Chartrand was raised in a strongly Roman Catholic household and still prays regularly. His faith is a blend of Catholicism and traditional Red River Métis beliefs.

Chartrand was audited by Canada Revenue Agency and flagged for not reporting income. The tax agency reassessed his tax returns and increased his employment income by $35,148 in 2004 and $37,460 in 2005 to include his omitted expense allowances.

Honours and awards 
Chartrand has been recognized for his community work and has received the Golden Eagle Award from the Indigenous Women's Collective, the Eagle Feather from the Friendship Centres of Ontario, and his picture has been placed on the Honour Wall of Fame at the Indian and Métis Friendship Centre of Winnipeg.

Chartrand was a recipient of the Queen Elizabeth II Golden Jubilee Medal, created in 2002 to commemorate the 50th anniversary of the ascension of Her Majesty Queen Elizabeth II to the throne, for outstanding and exemplary contributions to their communities or to Canada as a whole.

In 2004, he received The Manitoba Order of the Sash by resolution of the Métis Nation at the 36th Annual General Assembly of the Manitoba Metis Federation, for his cultural, political and social contributions to the Métis people.

In 2012 he received an Honorary Doctor of Laws degree from the University of Winnipeg for his dedication to the Métis people, his deep commitment to family and community, and for his enduring service and development work.

Also in 2012, Chartrand received the Queen Elizabeth II's Diamond Jubilee Medal for his significant contributions to Canada.

In 2013 he was invested into the Order of Manitoba in recognition of his demonstrated excellence and achievement benefiting in an outstanding manner the social, cultural or economic well-being of Manitoba and its residents.  

Also in 2013, he received the Order of the Métis Nation at the Métis National Council Annual General Assembly March 24, 2013.

In 2017, he received the Sovereign's Medal for Volunteers for his exceptional volunteer achievements and advancement of the cause of the Métis Nation at both the provincial and national levels and dedication to community, creating greater opportunities for all Manitobans.

In 2022, he became the first Indigenous recipient of the Lifetime Achievement Award from the India Canada Cultural and Heritage Association.

Also in 2022, President Chartrand received the Lanza Llanera Order of Democracy from the Republic of Colombia’s Assembly of Meta Department for his leadership in improving the living conditions of the Indigenous communities of Colombia and fostering international fair trade relationships in agricultural production, ancestral wisdom and medicines.

References

1960 births
Canadian Métis people
Indigenous leaders in Manitoba
Living people
Members of the Order of Manitoba
Métis politicians